13th Group may refer to:

 13th Carrier Air Group, a unit of the United Kingdom Royal Navy
 13th Air Expeditionary Group, a unit of the United States Air Force
 13th Bombardment Group, a unit of the United States Air Force

See also
 13th Army (disambiguation)
 XIII Corps (disambiguation)
 13th Division (disambiguation)
 13th Brigade (disambiguation)
 13th Regiment (disambiguation)
 13th Battalion (disambiguation)
 13 Squadron (disambiguation)